Andžs Flaksis (born 18 March 1991) is a Latvian professional road cyclist, who last rode for UCI Continental team .

Since 2020 races on amateur level with Latvian DTG/Mysport roadand MTB team.

Major results

2010
 2nd Time trial, National Under-23 Road Championships
 7th Overall Dookoła Mazowsza
2011
 1st  Time trial, National Under-23 Road Championships
 1st Scandinavian Race Uppsala
 3rd Ronde van Vlaanderen U23
 3rd Jurmala Grand Prix
 4th Memorial Oleg Dyachenko
2012
 National Road Championships
1st  Under-23 time trial
2nd Road race
3rd Time trial
 1st Riga Grand Prix
 2nd Road race, UEC European Under-23 Road Championships
2013
 National Under-23 Road Championships
1st  Time trial
2nd Road race
 5th Time trial, UEC European Under-23 Road Championships
2014
 3rd Time trial, National Road Championships
2015
 9th Reading 120
2016
 3rd Fort McLellan Road Race
 3rd Reading 120
2017
 1st  Overall Tour de Beauce
2019
 3rd Road race, National Road Championships
2021
 2nd Road race, National Road Championships

References

External links
 
 
 

1991 births
Living people
Latvian male cyclists